The Place de la Contrescarpe is a square in the 5th arrondissement of Paris.

Location and access
The Place de la Contrescarpe is located along rue Mouffetard, at the end of rue Lacépède and rue du Cardinal-Lemoine. It is at the center of four administrative quartiers or districts; Saint-Victor, Jardin-des-Plantes, Val-de-Grâce and Sorbonne, making it a central point of the 5th arrondissement.

Now popular with tourists, it contains many cafés, mostly recent. However, the facades of some buildings still show signs of the place as it used to be.

Name history
The place takes its name from the area around the former street rue de la Contrescarpe-Saint-Marcel, now shared between the rue Blainville and the rue du Cardinal-Lemoine, which made reference to the word contrescarpe (counterscarp in English), the embankment outside the ditch in front of the Wall of Philip II Augustus.

History
Opened in 1852, it was formed by the removal of a cluster of houses between the rue du Cardinal-Lemoine, rue Lacépède and rue Mouffetard. This cluster would today be located adjacent to the café Les Arts, that is, around the eastern part of the square.

References

Streets in the 5th arrondissement of Paris